ETS domain-containing protein Elk-4 is a protein that in humans is encoded by the ELK4 gene.

Function 

This gene is a member of the Ets family of transcription factors and of the ternary complex factor (TCF) subfamily. Proteins of the TCF subfamily form a ternary complex by binding to the serum response factor and the serum response element in the promoter of the c-fos proto-oncogene. The protein encoded by this gene is phosphorylated by the kinases, MAPK1 and MAPK8. Several transcript variants have been described for this gene.

Interactions 

ELK4 has been shown to interact with:
 BRCA1, and
 Serum response factor

References

Further reading

External links 
 
 

Transcription factors